Pieter Dormehl (4 November 1872 – 1 September 1958) was a South African international rugby union player who played as a forward.

He made 2 appearances for South Africa against the British Lions in 1896.

References

South African rugby union players
South Africa international rugby union players
1872 births
1958 deaths
Rugby union forwards
Rugby union players from Cape Town
Western Province (rugby union) players